Gay for Johnny Depp was an American hardcore band formed in New York, U.S. Members were: Sid Jagger (guitar – Real name: Joseph Grillo), Marty Leopard (vocals – Real name: Arty Shepherd), Chelsea Piers (bass), JJ Samanen (drums). They were known for the lyrical content of their songs, which is often concerned with the band's homoerotic obsession over the actor Johnny Depp.

History
Formed from ex-members of post-hardcore bands Garrison and Instruction in 2004, Gay for Johnny Depp released their first recording effort, Erotically Charged Dance Songs for the Desperate, on 12 July 2004. The 5-track EP was met with positive reviews which often compared Gay for Johnny Depp to fellow hardcore bands The Blood Brothers and The Locust.

The band recorded their second EP, Blood: The Natural Lubricant (An Apocalyptic Adventure Beyond Sodom and Gomorrah), in the summer of 2005, and released it on 19 September 2005 on the UK label Captains Of Industry. This was supported by a small tour of the UK. The record gained Gay for Johnny Depp a lot of fans, due to the unusual song titles as much as the music itself.

Gay for Johnny Depp played their first ever UK show on September 14, 2005, in Exeter, supporting Million Dead. During the show, frontman Marty Leopard was punched by an angry crowd member and had to go to the hospital to receive 5 stitches in his face.GIGWISE | Gay For Johnny Depp Attacked By Fan

On 9 June 2006 Gay for Johnny Depp played at the Download Festival in Donington Park, UK. In that same year, their song Sex In Your Mouth was released on the Kerrang! compilation album, New Breed.

The band's first full-length album, The Politics of Cruelty, was released on 5 November 2007; it was a rare example of a hardcore band receiving positive reviews in publications such as NME, Q, The Guardian and Uncut as well as heavier rock publications such as Rock Sound. A number of tracks also aired on BBC Radio 1.

Instead of featuring the usual biographical material, advance copies of the album sent to the media contained a highly explicit pornographic fan letter to actor Johnny Depp, purported to be written by someone simply known as 'Brad'. This approach was in keeping with the band's previous promotional material, which have included bottles of amyl nitrite, surgical rubber gloves, condoms, explicit homosexual photographs and further explicit letters from 'Brad'.

The band's debut album featured in the NME Top 10 chart throughout November 2007. That same month singer Marty was invited to take part in the NME's annual Pub Golf feature. Highlights of the evening have subsequently appeared on the internet.

Gay For Johnny Depp toured the UK in January and February 2008 and in April 2008 wearing nothing but socks on covering their private parts.

They toured the UK again between 13th Nov and 4th Dec 2009.

The band's second studio album What Doesn't Kill You, Eventually Kills You was released on February 14, 2011.

On 31 October 2011 they released a YouTube video and an email to their mailing list announcing they were going their separate ways.

Their second EP, Blood: The Natural Lubricant (An Apocalyptic Adventure Beyond Sodom and Gomorrah) was re-released in September 2012, this time on vinyl limited to 300 copies through independent UK label Moshtache Records.

Style
Gay for Johnny Depp have been described as spazzcore, hardcore, and metal. They are most well known for their vulgar, homoerotic lyrics focused around Johnny Depp; for example on "Kill The Cool Kids", Leopard sings "Cos I want my Johnny bleeding, fuck him in the ass!" The vocals are most often delivered in a high-pitched scream reminiscent of bands such as Ed Gein, The Locust, The Blood Brothers. Musically, the band are recognisable for a frantic, relentless style, with few songs lasting more than three minutes in length.

The band have been remixed by The Blacksmoke Organisation.

Discography

Albums
 The Politics of Cruelty (2007)
 Manthology: A Tireless Exercise in Narcissism Featuring Gay for Johnny Depp's Excellent Cadavers (2010)
 What Doesn't Kill You, Eventually Kills You (2011)

EPs
 Erotically Charged Dance Songs for the Desperate (2004)
 Blood: The Natural Lubricant (An Apocalyptic Adventure Beyond Sodom and Gomorrah) (2005)
 The Ski Mask Orgy (2009)

References

External links
 Official website
 Gay for Johnny Depp on MySpace
 Gay For Johnny Depp picture archive
 Explicit 2007 press release
 Gay For Johnny Depp on The Mag

Hardcore punk groups from New York (state)
Queercore groups
Musical groups established in 2004
2004 establishments in New York City
Musical groups disestablished in 2011
2011 disestablishments in New York (state)